Brighter Days is a 2018 album by Sigala.

Brighter Days may also refer to:

 Brighter Days, a 1999 album by Curtis Stigers
 Brighter Days, a 2019 album by  Robert Randolph and the Family Band
 "Brighter Days", a 1992 song by Green Velvet and Dajae
 "Brighter Days", a 2009 song by Leeland
 "Brighter Days", a 2018 song by San Holo featuring Bipolar Sunshine
 "Brighter Days", a song by Taylor Henderson from the 2014 studio album Burnt Letters
 "Brighter Days", a song by Emeli Sandé from the 2022 studio album Let's Say for Instance
 "Brighter Days (Are Before Us)", a 2021 song by Meet Me at the Altar

See also
 Brighter Daze, a 2015 studio album by Murs & 9th Wonder
 Brighter Day (disambiguation)